This list is of the Cultural Properties of Japan designated in the category of  for the Prefecture of Nagasaki.

National Cultural Properties
As of 1 July 2019, five  Important Cultural Properties have been designated, being of national significance.

Prefectural Cultural Properties
As of 1 May 2019, nineteen properties have been designated at a prefectural level.

See also
 Cultural Properties of Japan
 List of National Treasures of Japan (paintings)
 Japanese painting
 List of Historic Sites of Japan (Nagasaki)
 Nagasaki Prefectural Art Museum

References

External links
  Cultural Properties in Nagasaki Prefecture

Cultural Properties,Nagasaki
Cultural Properties,Paintings
Paintings,Nagasaki
Lists of paintings